The second United States airline to be named National Airlines was owned by United Air Carriers. It operated from 1977 to 1986.

History 
The airline was created when officials of the supplemental airline Overseas National Airways formed a FAR Part 129 leasing company known as United Air Carriers on July 21, 1977. When Overseas National Airways folded in 1978, the company was renamed to Overseas National Airways and was certified in 1980 under FAR 121 as a cargo and passenger charter company.

In 1982 the company gained approval for scheduled service, leading to the company purchasing the name National Airlines from Pan Am in anticipation of scheduled New York to Paris service. The scheduled service never materialized, although flights on the route were flown as charters. The company faced financial problems and by December 1985 it ceased operations, filing for bankruptcy in May 1986.

Fleet 
 Boeing 747

Incident 

 On 13 September 1982, an ONA DC-10-30, which was leased to Spantax and operating flight BX 995, was destroyed by fire after a burst nosewheel caused the captain to abort takeoff at Málaga, Spain. 51 individuals were killed, with 342 surviving.

See also 
 List of defunct airlines of the United States

Notes

Defunct airlines of the United States
Airlines established in 1977
Airlines disestablished in 1986